Verbascum creticum is a species of plants in the family Scrophulariaceae.

Sources

References 

creticum
Flora of Malta